Dato' Rashid bin Din (born 29 July 1946) was the Member of the Parliament of Malaysia for the Merbok constituency in the state of Kedah from 2008 to 2013. He sat in Parliament as a member of the People's Justice Party (PKR) in the opposition Pakatan Rakyat coalition.

Rashid won the seat of Merbok in the 2008 election. The seat, previously held comfortably by the Barisan Nasional coalition, swung to the PKR for Rashid to win it by 3,098 votes. Rashid was replaced as the PKR's candidate for the seat at the 2013 election, and the party lost the seat to the Barisan Nasional's Ismail Daut.

Honours
In January 2010, Rashid was conferred the honorific title of Datuk by Sultan Abdul Halim of Kedah.

 :
 Knight Companion of the Order of Loyalty to the Royal House of Kedah (D.S.D.K.) – Dato' (2010)

Election results

References

Living people
1946 births
People from Penang
People's Justice Party (Malaysia) politicians
Malaysian people of Malay descent
Malaysian Muslims
Members of the Dewan Rakyat